Quehuisha (possibly from Quechua for Amaranthus caudatus or for liver), Quehuicha, Queshihua, or Quihuisha is a mountain in the Chila mountain range in the Andes of Peru, about  high (according to another source ). It is located in the Arequipa Region, Caylloma Province, Lari District, west of the mountain Mismi.

The river Callumayo originates south of Quehuisha, between the small lakes Ticllacocha (possibly from Quechua for "two-colored lake") and Jatuncocha (possibly from Quechua for "big lake") near the little village Quihnisha. It flows to the south and ends in the Colca River .

References

Mountains of Peru
Mountains of Arequipa Region